Enid J. Wilson was for over 30 years a Lakeland contributor to The Guardian "Country Diary" (see also Harry Griffin). She was the daughter of George Abraham the photographer/climber and Winifred Davies, a cousin of the Abrahams' climbing partner, Owen Glynne Jones.

Her Enid J. Wilson's country diary won the Lakeland Book of the Year in 1989.

References
 Hankinson, Alan, (1975) Camera on the Crags, Heinemann
 Enid J. Wilson's Country Diary Enid J. Wilson (illustrated by Pavla Davey), Hodder and Stoughton (1988) 
 Reference to the "late Enid Wilson"

Year of birth missing
Year of death missing
Place of birth missing
British diarists
The Guardian journalists